Abington Vale is an area of Northampton in Northamptonshire, England.

To the south of Abington Vale is the Nene Valley Gravel Pits which is a Site of Special Scientific Interest (SSSI) as well as being a Special Protection Area.  To the east is Billing Aquadrome.There was an old school called Abington vale middle school nearby that opened in 1970. It closed in 2006 for an unknown reason.

References

Areas of Northampton